Rachel Simon (born 1959 in Newark, New Jersey) is an American author of both fiction and non-fiction. Her six books include the 2011 novel The Story of Beautiful Girl, and the 2002 memoir Riding the Bus with My Sister. Her work has been adapted for film, television, radio, and stage.

Riding the Bus with My Sister, a memoir about a year Simon spent with her developmentally disabled sister Beth, was adapted as the 2005 Hallmark Hall of Fame TV film Riding the Bus with My Sister, which starred  Andie MacDowell as Simon and Rosie O'Donnell as Beth. The film was directed by Anjelica Huston.

Bibliography
Little Nightmares, Little Dreams (1990) (short story collection)
The Magic Touch (1994) (novel)
The Writer's Survival Guide (1997)
Riding the Bus with My Sister (2002)
Building A Home With My Husband: A Journey Through The Renovation of Love (2009)
 Published in paperback in 2010 as The House On Teacher's Lane: A Memoir of Home, Healing, And Love's Hardest Questions
The Story Of Beautiful Girl (May 2011)

References

External links
RachelSimon.com
Interview in the literary magazine Wild River Review
Interview in Wordgathering: A Journal of Disability Poetry

1959 births
Living people
20th-century American novelists
21st-century American novelists
American women novelists
American women short story writers
Bryn Mawr College alumni
20th-century American women writers
21st-century American women writers
20th-century American short story writers
21st-century American short story writers
American Book Award winners